Veikko Hannes Ruotsalainen (12 May 1908 – 5 March 1986) was a Finnish skier.

Ruotsalainen was a member of the national Olympic military patrol team in 1928 which placed second.

References

1908 births
1986 deaths
Finnish military patrol (sport) runners
Olympic biathletes of Finland
Military patrol competitors at the 1928 Winter Olympics